Nashville, Tennessee is the 29th largest media market in the United States with roughly 966,000 homes, 0.8% of the country's media market.

Print

Daily newspapers
The Tennessean

Weekly newspapers
La Campana - Spanish newspaper
NashVegas Insider
Nashville Business Journal
The Nashville Pride
Nashville Scene

Monthly newspapers
The Contributor

Monthly magazines
Nashville Music Guide
NATIVE

Defunct newspapers
All The Rage — entertainment and events
The City Paper (general news and opinion; originally Monday-Friday, later twice weekly, and then weekly; published November 1, 2000 — August 9, 2013)
 The Daily American, (1876–1894) and The Nashville American (1894–September 25, 1910); merged into The Tennessean
The Labor Advocate (weekly 1902–1939)
Nashville Banner (ceased publication February 20, 1998)
Nashville Business in Review (1995–1997); later published as In Review (1997–1999) — alternative weekly (later biweekly) tabloid
Nashville Globe and Independent — African-American weekly (ceased publication in July 1960)
Nashville Times (weekly November 11, 1937–May 26, 1938, then daily; ceased publication July 28, 1940)

Defunct magazines
Advantage, The Nashville Business Magazine (monthly, 1978–1989, published by Advantage, Inc.)
Aluminum Magazine (monthly, June 1999 to August 1999)
Nashville (monthly, January 1963–April 1970)
Nashville (monthly, approx. 1978–1990, published by Advantage Publications Inc.)
Nashville Life (bimonthly, 1994–1999, published by Eagle Communications Inc.)
Tag Magazine (monthly)

Online news and blogs
NashvillePost.com
AntiochTenn.com
 StyleBlueprint

Television

Broadcast
Nashville is home to the nation's 30th largest television market, covering all of Middle Tennessee and parts of south central Kentucky.  This list includes full-power TV stations in the market, as well as low power television stations licensed for Nashville itself:

* indicates construction permit for LD (low-power digital TV)

Cable
Cable stations based in Nashville include Country Music Television and NRB Network. The Nashville Network was also based in Nashville until it closed in 2000.

Radio
Nashville is ranked by Arbitron as the 44th-largest radio market in the United States and its territories.

Its stations, licensed to Nashville and surrounding cities, include:

AM

FM

See also
 Tennessee media
 List of newspapers in Tennessee
 List of radio stations in Tennessee
 List of television stations in Tennessee
 Media of cities in Tennessee: Chattanooga, Knoxville, Memphis, Murfreesboro

References

Bibliography

External links
  (Directory ceased in 2017)
 

Nashville
 
Media